Cylinder valve can refer to
 an inlet or exhaust valve in a piston engine or compressor
 a valve to control the flow of gas into or out of a storage cylinder
 a scuba cylinder valve to control the flow of gas into or out of the diving cylinders of a scuba set 
 a valve to control flow of the actuating fluid into or out of a hydraulic or pneumatic cylinder